The men's long jump was an athletics event at the 1996 Summer Olympics in Atlanta, Georgia. There were 54 competitors from 41 nations, with one athlete not starting. The maximum number of athletes per nation had been set at 3 since the 1930 Olympic Congress. The event was won by Carl Lewis of the United States, the nation's fourth consecutive and 20th overall gold medal in the men's long jump. Lewis himself had won the four straight victories, becoming the third Olympian to win the same event four times in a row (after Al Oerter and Paul Elvstrøm, counting the latter's wins in the Firefly and Finn sailing classes as the same event) as well as the only man to win four long jump medals. It was the ninth and final Olympic gold of Lewis's career. James Beckford earned Jamaica's first medal in the event. Joe Greene matched his bronze from 1992, becoming the ninth two-medal winner in the event.

Summary
Carl Lewis was on the edge of making history, to equal the unique accomplishment of Al Oerter by winning four Olympic championships in the same event. However, now 35 years old, he was comparatively quite old for a sprinter-long jumper. Lewis barely made it to the Olympics, only finishing third at the 1996 Olympic Trials behind world record holder Mike Powell (at 33, also five years beyond his peak) and 29-year-old Joe Greene. These same three American jumpers had swept the event four years earlier.

While Lewis was ranked number one from the qualifying round, it took him three jumps to make the automatic qualifier. Lewis gained some notoriety by winning the 1984 Olympics on his single, first attempt. Powell, Greene and Iván Pedroso made their automatic qualifier (8.05 m) on their first attempt.

In the first round Emmanuel Bangué took the lead with 8.19 m. Powell moved into second place in the second round at 8.17 m, with Lewis jumping 8.10 m to move into third. Greene moved into the lead in the third round with an 8.24 m, until Lewis made his 8.50 jump. Lewis' jump equalled former rival Larry Myricks' still standing Masters M35 World Record.

While Pedroso was the reigning world champion and had jumped significantly better just a year earlier, he didn't get into the final eight to get three remaining jumps. No other jumper improved in his final jumps except James Beckford, whose final-round 8.29 m lifted him into the silver medal, pushing Greene to bronze.

Background

This was the 23rd appearance of the event, which is one of 12 athletics events to have been held at every Summer Olympics. The top six finishers from the 1992 Games returned: the American medal-sweeping team of Carl Lewis, Mike Powell, and Joe Greene, fourth-place finisher Iván Pedroso and fifth-place finisher Jaime Jefferson of Cuba, and sixth-place finisher Konstantinos Koukodimos of Greece; other returning finalists were eighth-place finisher Geng Huang of China and twelfth-place finisher Bogdan Tudor of Romania. Pedroso had surpassed Powell as the world's best jumper in 1995, winning the world championship. Both men, however, struggled with hamstring injuries coming into the Games. Lewis, the three-time Olympic champion, barely qualified for the American team behind Powell and Greene.

Armenia, Belarus, the British Virgin Islands, Croatia, the Czech Republic, the Gambia, the Netherlands Antilles, Sri Lanka, Turkmenistan, and Ukraine each made their first appearance in the event. The United States appeared for the 22nd time, most of any nation, having missed only the boycotted 1980 Games.

Competition format

The 1996 competition used the two-round format with divided final introduced in 1952. The qualifying round gave each competitor three jumps to achieve a distance of 8.05 metres; if fewer than 12 men did so, the top 12 (including all those tied) would advance. The final provided each jumper with three jumps; the top eight jumpers received an additional three jumps for a total of six, with the best to count (qualifying round jumps were not considered for the final).

Records

The standing world and Olympic records prior to the event were as follows.

No new world or Olympic records were set during the competition.

Schedule

All times are Eastern Daylight Time (UTC-4)

Results

Qualifying

Final

See also
 1994 Men's European Championships Long Jump (Helsinki)
 1995 Men's World Championships Long Jump (Gothenburg)
 1997 Men's World Championships Long Jump (Athens)
 1998 Men's European Championships Long Jump (Budapest)

References

External links
 Official Report
 Results
 Official Video Highlights

L
Long jump at the Olympics
Men's events at the 1996 Summer Olympics